Karl Hohmann (18 June 1908, in Düsseldorf – 31 March 1974, in Benrath) was a German football (soccer) player.

Between 1930 and 1937, he played 26 times and scored 20 goals for the Germany national football team. He played in the 1934 FIFA World Cup, scoring 2 goals in the 2-1 quarter-final win against Sweden. Germany went on to finish third. He was also part of Germany's squad at the 1936 Summer Olympics.

Later, he became the coach of Rot-Weiss Essen, leading them to win the 1953 German Cup.

References

External links
International career

1908 births
1974 deaths
German footballers
Germany international footballers
German football managers
1934 FIFA World Cup players
Olympic footballers of Germany
Footballers at the 1936 Summer Olympics
Rot-Weiss Essen managers
Association football midfielders
FK Pirmasens players
Footballers from Düsseldorf
20th-century German people
West German football managers